The London, Midland and Scottish Railway (LMS) Coronation Class is a class of express passenger steam locomotives designed by William Stanier. They were an enlarged and improved version of his previous design, the LMS Princess Royal Class, and on test were the most powerful steam locomotives ever used in Britain at 2,511 dbhp. The locomotives were specifically designed for power as it was intended to use them on express services between London Euston and Glasgow Central; their duties were to include the hauling of a proposed non-stop express, subsequently named the Coronation Scot. The first ten locomotives of the Coronation class were built in a streamlined form in 1937 by the addition of a steel streamlined casing. Five of these ten were specifically set aside to pull the Coronation Scot. Although a later batch of five unstreamlined locomotives was produced in 1938, most of the ensuing Coronation class were outshopped as streamliners. From 1944 until production ended in 1948, all-new engines were built in unstreamlined form and all the streamliners had their casings removed. The last of the 38 locomotives was completed in 1948.

The Coronation class was probably painted in more styles of livery than any other engine class; seven in the LMS era up to 1947 and five more during the British Railways era from 1948 onwards. That does not mean that all 38 locomotives were painted in all these different styles; many were specific to just a few engines. The only style that all 38 bore was the British Railways lined Locomotive Green and the entire class was turned out thus between 1955 and 1958.

It was customary on all British mainline journeys to change engines at convenient locations to avoid the lengthy process of re-coaling. The Coronation locomotives were therefore strategically stationed at key points between London and Glasgow and they would be assigned to the shed at that location. The chosen locations were at London (Camden shed), Crewe (Crewe North), Carlisle (Upperby) and Glasgow (Polmadie). It was only in the latter days of steam that the mix of shed assignments became more fluid.

No. 6220 Coronation held the British steam speed record between 1937 and 1938, . It held that record until beaten by 4468 Mallard in 1938. Secondly, No. 6234 Duchess of Abercorn holds the record to this day for the greatest British power output to be officially recorded on an attached dynamometer car, achieved in 1939. The Coronation class was represented at the 1948 British Railways locomotive exchange trials, designed to compare the performances of similar locomotives from the four pre-nationalised companies, but the engine performed disastrously. Gone was any hint of the power that could be unleashed by these engines; instead, low coal consumption was the target . One of the class was involved in the Harrow and Wealdstone rail crash precipitated by 46242 City of Glasgow. This was the second-worst rail crash in British history, the death toll being 112.

After a successful decade of operations in the 1950s, the 1960s' modernisation plan was the ultimate undoing of the Coronations. The increasing use of diesel locomotives made many of the class redundant, and the electrification of the main line between London Euston and Crewe resulted in their banishment from this important section of the main line as there was insufficient clearance between the locomotives and the live wires. With no useful role to play, the survivors were scrapped from late 1962 to late 1964. Three locomotives were saved for preservation, with one of them ending up in the National Collection. As at October 2016, two were static in museums whilst the third is certified for main line service.

Design history 
Although the prior introduction of the Princess Royal class had provided the London Midland and Scottish Railway (LMS) with more powerful locomotives to be used on the main line between London Euston and Glasgow Central, the board of directors were persuaded in 1936 that more such locomotives would be needed, particularly as they were being asked to approve the introduction of a new non-stop service between those cities, designated the Coronation Scot. Initially, the Chief Mechanical Engineer, William Stanier, planned to build five more Princess Royals, but the Chief Technical Assistant and Chief Draughtsman at the LMS Derby Works, Tom Coleman, argued that it would be preferable to design a new class of locomotive that was more powerful, more reliable and easier to maintain. Stanier was convinced and the drawing office commenced designing the new class. When Stanier was called on to perform an assignment in India, Coleman became responsible for most of the detailed design in his absence.

Compared to the Princess Royal Class, there were important differences which would lead to an improved performance. Also, the steam passages were better streamlined for greater efficiency and, most importantly, the piston valves went up in size from 8 inches to 9.5 inches. The outside cylinders were moved forward with rocking shafts operating the inside cylinders. Finally a coal pusher was incorporated into the tender so the fireman did not have to "bring the coal forward", significantly cutting his workload which was particularly important on the long runs from Euston to Glasgow.

Just as the new design was approaching finalisation, the LMS marketing department created a difficult problem. The London & North Eastern Railway (LNER) had recently introduced its streamlined Class A4 locomotive which had captured the imagination of the public, and the marketing department persuaded the board that the LMS's new locomotives should be streamlined too. This was problematic in that the new design was so large that it only just conformed to the maximum loading gauge for the main line; moreover, it was sufficiently heavy that it was close to the Civil Engineer's maximum weight limit. Nevertheless, Coleman managed to design a streamlined steel casing that hugged the locomotive so tightly that it could still meet the loading gauge.

The casing was tested in a wind tunnel, and retained after it was found to be as good as other forms of streamlining. After introduction it was subsequently found that its aerodynamic form failed to disturb the air sufficiently to lift the exhaust from the chimney, thus obstructing the driver's vision with smoke.

Construction history

Locomotives 
The first five locomotives, Nos. 6220–6224, were built in 1937 at the LMS Crewe Works at an average cost of £11,641 each. They were all intended to haul the Coronation Scot, so the locomotives and the special trainsets bore a common livery. The locomotives were streamlined and painted Caledonian Railway blue with silver horizontal lines along each side of the locomotive. The special trainsets that they hauled were painted the same shade of blue and the silver lining was repeated along each side of the coaches.

In 1938 the second five locomotives of the class, Nos. 6225–6229 (named after Duchesses) were also built in streamlined form at an average cost of £11,323 each. They were painted in the same shade of crimson lake which had already been applied to the Princess Royal class; the same style of horizontal lining that had been a feature of the first five locomotives was continued, but in gilt. Although the crimson lake matched the standard LMS rolling stock, there was no attempt to apply the gilt lining along the sides of these coaches. A prototype trainset was built with such lining for exhibition in America, but it was never put into service due to the outbreak of the Second World War.

Stanier, the designer of the locomotives, felt that the added weight and difficulty in maintenance due to the streamlining was too high a price to pay for the actual benefits gained at high speed. Therefore, in 1938 a third batch of five locomotives (again named after Duchesses) was built, Nos. 6230–6234, without streamlining at an average cost of £10,659 each.

During 1939 and 1940, a fourth batch of ten locomotives (Nos. 6235–6244) was built in streamlined form commencing with No. 6235 City of Birmingham. The names of cities for the locomotives would seem to have been adopted because the LMS was fast running out of names of Duchesses. These locomotives cost an average of £10,659 for the first five and £10,838 each for the second five. The names of the cities in this batch were in strict alphabetical order. This came to an end when No. 6244 City of Leeds was patriotically renamed King George VI in 1941.

The fifth batch, again named after cities, comprised four locomotives, Nos. 6245–6248. These engines were built during 1943 and the average cost was held to £10,908 due to the incorporation of recycled boilers. During the Second World War, the Materials Committee of the government tried to balance the needs for steel between civilian departments and the War Department when allocating those resources. Despite these constraints, the entire batch was still outshopped in streamlined form.

The theme of cities continued into 1944 when another batch of four, Nos. 6249–6252, was built without streamlining. The cost of these locomotives averaged £11,664 each. A follow-up batch of three locomotives (Nos. 6253–6255) was built in 1946 and this batch attracted an inflationary average cost of £15,460 each. The problem of hanging smoke was addressed and smoke deflectors were now incorporated into the design.

The final two locomotives were constructed to the modified design of George Ivatt who succeeded both Stanier, following his retirement, and Stanier's immediate successor Charles Fairburn, who unexpectedly died in office. The first, No. 6256 built in 1947, was the last of the class to be built before nationalisation and it was therefore named in honour of its original designer Sir William A. Stanier, F.R.S.. The unveiling of the nameplate was performed by Stanier himself. In 1948, the privately owned railways were nationalised and incorporated into British Railways. It was within this new regime that No. 46257 was completed – in common with other LMS locomotives, 40000 had been added to the original numbers. The spiralling costs after the Second World War, combined with the design changes, resulted in the individual cost of these locomotives escalating to £21,411.

Tenders

Overview 

The original design of tender, which came to be known as Type 'A' was designed for the first ten streamlined locomotives. These were of welded tank construction and included side sheets extending from the rear of the tender, which had the effect of reducing drag from eddies between the tender and the leading coach. 28 of these were constructed to be coupled with all the 24 streamliners (Nos. 6220–6229 and Nos. 6235–6248) as well as four of the unstreamlined locomotives (Nos. 6249–6252). In practice, it would seem that the side sheets made it more difficult to access the water filler as well as the couplings.

A second, more traditional design followed for the initial batch of five unstreamlined locomotives (Nos. 6230–6234). Again they were of welded tank construction, but lacked any of the streamlining add-ons. Even without the streamlining Type 'B' tenders were distinguishable from Type 'A' by having a slightly different profile at the front and steps and handrails at the rear.

The third design, by George Ivatt, initially was Type 'C1' and it was paired with the three locomotives Nos. 6253–6255. It was partially riveted and resembled a Type 'A' at its front end and a Type 'B' at the rear. The design was quickly followed by Type 'C2', which differed from the 'C1' in that it had a lower front edge and was fitted with Timken roller bearings. Only two 'C2's were built and they were coupled to the last two of the class, Nos. 6256 and 46257.

Whilst nearly fifteen of the tenders remained wedded to their original locomotives, others received new partners – the very first tender to be manufactured swapped partners seven times. After the Second World War, when the streamlined tenders were de-streamlined, it was difficult to spot any mismatches. The most readily visible mismatches were those of locomotives Nos. 6249–6252 where pre-produced Type 'A' streamlined tenders were married to unstreamlined locomotives.

An unusual feature of all Coronation Class tenders was that they were fitted with a steam-operated coal pusher to bring the coal down to the firing plate. When this was in operation a plume of steam could be seen rising from the rear face of the coal bunker backwall.

Table of tender and locomotive pairings 
All LMS tenders were given their own unique identity numbers and they tended to be constructed in advance of the locomotives they would be paired with. Hence, they were made in four batches, Nos. 9703–9709, 9743–9752, 9798–9817 and 10622-10624.

The following table lists the locomotives to which they were attached. Of note is the fact that locomotive No. 46221 had its tender (No.9816) withdrawn ahead of time in 1962; the locomotive was then paired to the Princess Royal tender No. 9359 until its withdrawal in May 1963.

Modifications

Double chimneys 
Single chimneys were fitted to Nos. 6220–6234 when built. Following a successful trial using No. 6234 Duchess of Abercorn on 26 February 1939, these were replaced with double blastpipes and chimneys between 1939 and 1944, the last being No. 6220 Coronation. From No. 6235 onwards, all the locomotives were built with double blastpipes and chimneys.

Smoke deflectors 
Following a report by George Ivatt in 1945, smoke deflectors were introduced due to drifting smoke obscuring the crew's forward vision. The first locomotive to be fitted with smoke deflectors from the outset was No. 6253 City of St. Albans in September 1946. All the following four locomotives included this feature. The first unstreamlined locomotive to be retrofitted was No. 6232 Duchess of Montrose in February 1945.

Removal of streamlining 
George Ivatt's 1945 report also recommended the removal of all streamlining casings and they were removed from the fitted locomotives from 1946 onwards. It had been found to be of little value at speeds below , and was unpopular with running shed employees as it caused difficulty of access for maintenance. The first step towards de-streamlining was carried out during the Second World War when many of the streamlined tenders had their side sheets cut away at the rear of the tender. Many photographs exist showing this measure. The removal of the streamlining proper commenced in April 1946 with No. 6235 City of Birmingham. All de-streamlining coincided with the fitting of smoke deflectors. No. 6243 City of Lancaster was renumbered as 46243 in April 1948 and, as it was not de-streamlined until May 1949, it became the only locomotive to carry its British Railways number while streamlined.

Initially, locomotives that had previously been streamlined could be readily recognised by the sloping top to the front of their smokeboxes, as well as slightly smaller front-facing cab windows.  In due course all were re-equipped with cylindrical smokeboxes and larger cab windows, often, but not necessarily, at the same time.The first locomotive to receive a cylindrical smokebox was No. 6226 Duchess of Norfolk in October 1952. The last one to retain the sloping top was 46246 City of Manchester which appeared with its new smokebox in May 1960.

Even following the conversion to cylindrical smokeboxes, it was still possible to distinguish some non-streamliners from ex-streamliners. On the former (Nos. 46230-46234 and 46249-46252, but not 46253-46257) the running plates veered downwards at right angles to connect with the buffer beam in the style of the Princess Royal Class. The ex-streamliners did not have any such connection, except No.46242 City of Glasgow which was rebuilt in 1952 following a serious collision.

The final locomotives 
The final two locomotives Nos. 6256 and 46257 Sir William A. Stanier, F.R.S and City of Salford were given many new features. In order to raise the mileage between general overhauls from 70,000 to 100,000, measures were taken to decrease wear to the axle bearings and hornguides through the use of roller bearings and manganese steel linings. Other modifications included further superheating area, a redesigned rear frame and cast steel trailing truck, rocking grate, hopper ashpan and redesigned cab-sides.

Automatic warning system 
During the twentieth century, signals passed at danger (SPADs) were increasingly perceived as a significant danger to the public. Only the Great Western Railway truly accepted the challenge posed. Prior even to 1910, it commenced installing Automatic Train Control (ATC), a system where each distant signal was accompanied by a ramp between the tracks with which a shoe on the locomotive would make contact as it passed over it. When the signal denoted "clear", an electric current would pass through the ramp which was detected by the shoe, thereby sounding a bell in the cab. With the signal at danger, the electric current would be cut off and when the shoe detected this it would activate a warning horn. In later forms, the brakes would be applied should the driver fail to acknowledge the warning.

In 1952, the UK's most disastrous SPAD ever occurred at Harrow and Wealdstone, in which No. 46242 City of Glasgow was severely damaged. The lack of an ATC system on most of Britain's railways was at last seen as an urgent issue. From 1956 the BR-designed Automatic Warning System (AWS) was installed. It was similar to ATC but relied on an induced magnetic field rather than an electric current and featured a visual indicator in the cab. The receiving system was installed on the Coronation class locomotives from 1959 onwards. The outward evidence of on-board AWS comprised a protective shield behind the front screw coupling, a box to house the necessary batteries immediately in front of the cab on the right-hand side and a cylindrical vacuum reservoir above the right-hand running plate.

Liveries

The LMS era

Pre-1942 
Before applying the top coats of paint, the LMS would apply a matt undercoat of shop grey. The first non-streamlined loco was fitted with mock-up nameplates and numbers for each of the first batch of locos which was then photographed to mimic each individual loco. Those temporary nameplates are now in the NRM's collection in York. The ensuing LMS top coats for the Coronation Class came in two basic colours during this period: Caledonian blue and crimson lake. Linings for streamliners involved the renowned 'speed whiskers' comprising stripes emerging from a fixed point in the lower centre of the front of the locomotive to run in parallel along the sides. Non-streamliners carried the standard LMS-style lining.

The first five locomotives, Nos. 6220–6224, were painted in Caledonian blue with banding in silver-coloured aluminium paint. Wheels, lining to the edges of the bands, and the background to the chromium-plated nameplates were painted in a darker blue, Navy or Prussian blue.

The second and fourth batches of streamlined locomotives, Nos. 6225–6229 and 6235–6244, were painted in crimson lake, with banding in gold lined with vermilion and black. Nameplates had a black background. LMS shop grey was carried briefly in service on No. 6229 Duchess of Hamilton from 7 September 1938 until its return to Crewe Works later that year. It was then painted crimson lake and disguised as No. 6220, in preparation for the 1939 visit to the New York World's Fair. Lettering and numerals for both Caledonian blue and crimson lake liveries were in a newly created style of unshaded sans-serif.

The non-streamlined Nos. 6230–6234 were painted in a special version of the standard crimson lake livery. The locomotives were lined out in gold bordered with fine red lines. Serif lettering and numerals in gold leaf and vermillion shading were applied. Handrails and sundry small external fittings were chrome-plated, as were the nameplates, which had a black background.

Two unusual events have been recorded. Firstly, in 1940 No. 6221 Queen Elizabeth had its Caledonian blue colour scheme replaced by the crimson lake, the only such instance. Secondly, it was often speculated that at some time in the two-year history of the Coronation Scot a crimson streamliner might have hauled the blue trainset. Such an event has, probably uniquely, been captured on film.

Post-1942 

Black was the overriding colour for this period, with one exception. Streamlined locomotives Nos. 6245–6248 were outshopped at Crewe in 1943 painted plain black. The following two batches, Nos. 6249–6255, constructed without streamlining, were also painted unlined black; the lettering and numerals on all these locomotives was in serif style coloured yellow with red shading. From 1946 onwards de-streamlined locomotives were mostly repainted in black with LMS-style lining. The lining comprised a broad maroon centre with fine straw yellow edging. Lettering and numbers were in a sans-serif Grotesque font, coloured yellow with an inner maroon line. By the end of 1947, 29 of the 37 locomotives were painted thus.

The one exception to black was No. 6234 Duchess of Abercorn which in 1946 was painted in a blue-grey colour. This represented the proposed post-war livery and the lining, painted on one side of the locomotive only, comprised a pale straw yellow line along the running plate with yellow and black edging to cab and tender. Lettering and numerals used a sans-serif font.

Table of LMS liveries 
The following table lists the liveries carried by the Coronation class between June 1937 and December 1947. The blue-grey livery has never been authenticated in a colour photograph.

The British Railways era

Pre-1951 
Early in 1948, before the new liveries for the whole of British Railways had been decided upon, Nos. 46229, 46232 and 46236 were repainted in LMS-style lined black and No. 46257 was similarly turned out when constructed in July. Throughout 1948 and 1949 the English locomotives (now under the control of the London Midland Region of British Railways) were repainted in BR lined black. However, the Scottish locomotives based at Glasgow's Polmadie shed, which were under the control of the Scottish Region, were destined for a brighter future. Commencing in May 1948, seven of the class were called in to be painted in "experimental blue". So sudden was this decision that No. 46232, fresh in LMS-style lined black following its heavy general repair, was called back after a mere four days to be repainted blue. Around this time BR was also experimenting with various shades of green on the other regions.

The Polmadie experiment was upheld by British Railways in 1949 when the somewhat darker BR standard blue was selected for all its large passenger locomotives, despite the fact that the Great Western Railway (GWR), the Southern Railway (SR) and the London & North Eastern Railway (LNER) had overwhelmingly painted their locomotives green (the LMS by contrast concentrating on crimson lake). Blue was subsequently carried by 27 of the 38 Coronation Class locomotives. The first two to be so painted, Nos. 46242 and 46243 were outshopped in the new colour when they received their heavy general repairs in May 1949. The blue livery, which was subsequently phased out, lasted until September 1955.

British Railways undertook a massive programme to establish itself by repainting all its locomotives with their new BR numbers and replacing their previous corporate identity with its own. Gone were the tenders proclaiming the railway companies' logos, emblems and even coats of arms, to be replaced by the stark BRITISH RAILWAYS lettering. The enormity of this task meant that the necessary repainting was not necessarily carried out to coincide with an overall repaint. For the Coronation Class, all locomotives had been through this process by the end of 1948 except for Nos. 6223, 6238, 6248, 6250, and 6252–6255, a total of 29 locomotives. Only thirteen locomotives out of the 29 received new liveries to accompany their renumbering.

Subsequently, in 1949 a crest was designed to replace the spartan BRITISH RAILWAYS logo. In turn, this would be replaced in 1956 by yet another design of crest.

Post-1951 

The decision to adopt blue as the standard colour was subsequently reversed and Locomotive green was introduced in November 1951 with No. 46232 Duchess of Montrose. Between October 1955 and December 1957, all 38 locomotives carried it concurrently, the only livery the entire class carried.

In the late 1950s the decision was made that the London Midland Region's main line locomotives could carry the colour maroon. This permission did not extend to the Scottish Region whose locomotives remained green until withdrawal.

The LMR maroon was carried on 16 locomotives from the late 1950s: Nos. 46225-6, 46228-9, 46236, 46238, 46240, 46243-48, 46251, 46254 and 46256. No. 46245 was the first, in December 1957; a further fifteen examples followed between May and November 1958. The style of lining varied: the first six repaints into maroon (including No. 46245) were lined out in the LMS style; the last ten received the BR style of lining as used on the standard green livery; No. 46247, originally lined in the LMS style, was given the BR style in July 1959; and by November 1961 those with the BR lining were repainted to match No. 46245.

Because of insufficient clearance between the locomotives and the 25 kV overhead electric wires south of Crewe, the whole class was banned from operating under them with effect from 1 September 1964. To highlight this prohibition a yellow diagonal stripe was painted on the cab sides. This inability of the locomotives to operate on the line for which they were designed was crucial in the decision to withdraw the entire class.

Table of BR liveries 
The table below lists the various liveries applied to the locomotives from 1 Jan 1948. Repaints in the same livery are not included.

Shed allocations

Overview 

Initially all the locomotives were allocated to Camden shed in London (LMS designation 1B). By 1939 there were nineteen officially stationed there. This came to an abrupt end when war was declared in September of that year, as the Government had decreed that in such an event all Britain's largest locomotives would be mothballed for the duration.  Consequently, seven of the class were immediately dispatched to either Holyhead or to Rugby (via Manchester Longsight). Within weeks the stupidity of this policy was realised and the locomotives were returned to service. 

In 1940 some of the class were reallocated to Crewe North (5A) and Glasgow Polmadie (27A, 66A from 1950). As the numbers grew, Crewe North was generally the beneficiary, but in 1946 Carlisle Upperby (12B, 12A from 1958), received an initial allocation of six locomotives. At various times locomotives were also seconded to Liverpool Edge Hill (8A). A typical allocation of the 1950s was Camden 15, Crewe North 10, Polmadie 9 and Upperby 4.

During the 1960s the installation of overhead electrification commenced between London Euston and both Liverpool Lime Street and Manchester Piccadilly. Phase 1 comprised electrification between Crewe and Liverpool and Manchester. Phase 2 involved the extension southwards from Crewe to London. The massive proportions of the Coronation Class resulted in their prohibition from operating under those wires. Camden's allocation was now run down (the remaining locomotives being transferred to nearby Willesden (1A)), whilst Polmadie's was dispensed with entirely. The bulk of the class was situated at either Crewe North or Carlisle, the Kingmoor shed (12A, 68A from 1958) now being used in addition to Upperby.

Table of shed allocations 
The entire class saw service at the following sheds. The table lists the recorded allocations, but many temporary loans are not recorded – throughout the working life of the class, these may have been considerable. It also ignores the participation of No. 46236 in the Locomotive Exchange Trials of 1948, the transfer of No. 46225 to the Rugby Test Station for several months in 1955 and the secondment of Nos. 46237, 46254 and 46257 to the Western Region in 1955 and 1956.

There were wide variations in these histories. Six of the 1937–38 batches led a quiet life, being situated at Polmadie for the whole of their lives, apart from their initial spell at Camden. Others were moved from shed to shed for most of their lives, Nos. 6228, 6251 and 6252 being particularly well travelled.

Records

British speed record 
Between 1937 and 1939, two significant records were set by locomotives of the Coronation class. Before the introduction of the Coronation Scot service, No. 6220 Coronation headed a special train of invited guests from London Euston to Crewe on 29 June 1937. After a fast but uneventful run the engine was accelerated up to high speed. The brakes were applied far too late at such a speed and the result was that the train entered a series of crossover points at Crewe much too fast.

British power record 
Following an earlier test using No. 6234 Duchess of Abercorn which indicated that the locomotive's power was compromised by its single blastpipe, a double blastpipe and chimney were installed. On 26 February 1939, a retest was undertaken and No. 6234 hauled a train of 20 coaches, including a dynanometer car, from Crewe to Glasgow and back. This remains the official British record for a steam locomotive to this day. This sustained power output could not be expected on day-to-day service as it was beyond the shovelling capacity of a single fireman, and two firemen were carried for this test run.

Some seventeen years later, No. 46225 Duchess of Gloucester, a virtually identical sister engine, was tested by British Railways on the open road on the Settle and Carlisle line.

1948 locomotive exchange trials 
In May 1948 the BR Executive arranged a series of locomotive exchanges whereby each of the "Big Four" previously independent companies would submit its various locomotives for evaluation. It was intended that each locomotive would be tested not only on its own home territory, but on the tracks of its three other "rivals". The aim was to ascertain the best qualities of the competing locomotives in order to help design future locomotives. In that dynamometer cars were to accompany the test trains, whilst coal consumption was to be accurately measured, it was unclear whether the aim was to test the locomotives for power or for efficiency – the two are somewhat incompatible.

The locomotive classes were all pre-chosen by BR, but the various regions were free to choose, within certain parameters, which specific locomotives were to be represented. Tasked with supplying a suitable Coronation, the London Midland Region (LMR) selected No. 46236 City of Bradford. Regions were also free to choose their drivers. To drive the engine throughout, the LMR chose driver Byford from Camden shed who was seen to be sufficiently experienced. City of Bradford was then tested on its home ground between London Euston and Carlisle, on the Eastern Region (ER) between London Kings Cross and Leeds, on the Western Region (WR) between London Paddington and Plymouth, then finally on the Southern Region (SR) between London Waterloo and Exeter.

The results showed that, compared with its peer locomotives, City of Bradford's coal consumption was the second lowest (and well below the third lowest), but its power output was well below any of its peers. In later years some insight has emerged concerning No. 46236's outings. On the WR, having arrived at Plymouth from Paddington, the dynamometer crew were amazed that such a large locomotive had consumed so little coal; on the undulating tracks of the SR west of Salisbury, it was alleged that coal consumption was held down by running gently uphill then racing downhill without any attempt to follow the timetable passing times. Additionally, a photograph of the locomotive leaving Kings Cross, bound for Leeds on the ER, shows the locomotive with so little coal on board that none could be seen even from a somewhat elevated vantage point.  In other publications, driver Byford has been heavily criticised for his lacklustre driving  Certainly, Byford was so obsessed with minimising coal consumption that he never attempted to demonstrate any other facet of performance, but when coal consumption was being so accurately measured it was a reasonable assumption to draw that coal efficiency was the predominant requirement. Many years later, there was a degree of exoneration for driver Byford when the whole procedure was described as "the most inconsequential and unrepresentative series of competitive trials ever to be held on the railways of Great Britain".

Accidents and incidents 

Two people were killed and three were injured.

On 21 July 1947, locomotive No. 6244 King George VI was derailed at  near Polesworth, Warwickshire due to the poor state of the track following the years of neglect throughout the Second World War. Coaches piled up behind it and five passengers were killed and 64 injured. On 19 November 1951 No. 46252 City of Leicester, whilst traversing from the fast line to the slow, was derailed at almost the same spot. This time there was no pile-up and no serious injury.

On 17 April 1948, locomotive No. 6251 City of Nottingham was hauling a mail train which was in a rear-end collision with a passenger train at Winsford, Cheshire. In the first major accident for the newly formed British Railways, 24 people were killed and thirty injured.

On 25 April 1949, locomotive No. 46230 Duchess of Buccleuch was hauling a passenger train that overran a signal and was derailed at Douglas Park Signal Box, Motherwell, Lanarkshire. The signalman was suspected of having deliberately moved points under the train.

Another express passenger train ran into the wreckage. In the second deadliest railway accident in the United Kingdom, 112 people were killed at the scene and 10 more died later from their injuries; no fewer than 340 people were injured.

On 3 February 1954, locomotive No. 46250 City of Lichfield was hauling a passenger train that was derailed inside Watford Tunnel, Hertfordshire due to a broken rail. The rear three carriages became divided from the train at  station, with one of them ending up on the platform. Fifteen people were injured.

There were three instances of firebox crown collapse, resulting in boiler explosions. No. 6224 Princess Alexandra suffered a severe failure at Craigenhill on 10 September 1940 due to the inexperience of the crew (who both perished). The same locomotive suffered a similar failure on 7 March 1948 at Lamington due to dirty and malfunctioning water gauge glasses. The third incident occurred as No. 46238 City of Carlisle was passing Bletchley on 24 January 1962 – this was attributed to faulty design of the water gauge glasses.

Withdrawals

Overview 
The London Midland Region, compared with some of the other Regions, was slow to discard its "Big Engines". By a matter of a few days, the Western Region had managed to withdraw the whole of its King Class locomotives before the Coronation Class lost its first. The beginning of the end occurred late in December 1962 when it was deemed uneconomic to proceed with major repairs required by three locomotives. Nos. 46227, 46231 and 46232 were therefore summarily withdrawn.

Nos. 46234, 46246 and 46253 followed the next month and throughout 1963 the entire initial batch, Nos. 46220-46224, was withdrawn along with Nos. 46230, 46242, 46247, 46249 and 46252. These withdrawals meant that by the New Year of 1964, there were only 22 of the class remaining. Nos. 46229, 46233 and 46236 followed in early 1964, although two of this group – No. 46229 Duchess of Hamilton and No. 46233 Duchess of Sutherland – were destined for preservation.

Attempts were now made to find a role for the remaining 19 locomotives. By now many had been relegated to hauling trains in what were once seen as remote outposts of the LMS. Often they were reduced to pulling stopping trains, empty stock trains, or even goods trains. Only one realistic mainline role was contemplated: to replace the Scottish Region A4 Class on the testing route between Edinburgh Waverley and Aberdeen. This idea was discarded largely because it would be excessively problematic to train the A4 crews to operate the Coronations. With no credible role, only one option remained: in July 1964 it was resolved that the remaining 19 locomotives were to be withdrawn from 12 September.

Accordingly, the remaining locomotives were nominally taken out of service on 12 September 1964 apart from No. 46256 Sir William A. Stanier, F.R.S which hauled a special train on 26 September 1964. By October all were officially withdrawn. Up until March 1964 all the withdrawn Coronation class locomotives were cut up for scrap at Crewe Works, but the simultaneous withdrawal of all nineteen remaining locomotives in the autumn of 1964 (one of which was preserved) was too much to deal with and the work was contracted out to private firms. J. Cashmore at Great Bridge, Staffordshire, accounted for nine of the batch, the West of Scotland Shipbreaking Company at Troon, Ayrshire, dispatched eight and the Central Wagon Company at Wigan, Lancashire, disposed of the one remaining.

Table of withdrawals 
The following table lists the fate of the Coronation Class locomotives following their withdrawal from service.  
{| class="wikitable sortable collapsible collapsed"
! BR No.
! Name
! Withdrawn
! Location of storage
! Scrapped
! Location of scrappage
|-
| 46220
| Coronation
| 
| Crewe North
| 
| Crewe Works
|-
| 46221
| Queen Elizabeth
| 
| Willesden
| 
| Crewe Works
|-
| 46222
| Queen Mary
| 
| Polmadie
| 
| Crewe Works
|-
| 46223
| Princess Alice
| 
| Polmadie
| 
| Crewe Works
|-
| 46224
| Princess Alexandra
| 
| Polmadie
| 
| Crewe Works
|-
| 46225
| Duchess of Gloucester
| 
| Upperby
| 
| West of Scotland Shipbreaking Company
|-
| 46226
| Duchess of Norfolk
| 
| Kingmoor (Carlisle)
| 
| West of Scotland Shipbreaking Company
|-
| 46227
| Duchess of Devonshire
| 
| Parkhead (Glasgow)
| 
| Crewe Works
|-
| 46228
| Duchess of Rutland
| 
| Crewe North
| 
| J. Cashmore
|-
| 46229
| Duchess of Hamilton
| 
|
|
|Preserved and displayed at the National Railway Museum, York.
|-
| 46230
| Duchess of Buccleuch| 
| Polmadie
| 
| Crewe Works
|-
| 46231
| Duchess of Atholl| 
| Polmadie (to Sep 1963)  Carstairs (Lanarkshire)
| 
| Crewe Works
|-
| 46232
| Duchess of Montrose| 
| Polmadie (to Sep 1963)  Carstairs
| 
| Crewe Works
|-
| 46233
| Duchess of Sutherland| 
|
|
| Preserved and displayed at Butlin's Holiday Camp, Ayr|-
| 46234
| Duchess of Abercorn| 
| Upperby
| 
| Crewe Works
|-
| 46235
| City of Birmingham| 
|
|
| Preserved and displayed at the Museum of Science and Industry, Birmingham|-
| 46236
| City of Bradford| 
| Kingmoor
| 
| Crewe Works
|-
| 46237
| City of Bristol| 
| Upperby
| 
| West of Scotland Shipbreaking Company
|-
| 46238
| City of Carlisle| 
| Upperby
| 
| West of Scotland Shipbreaking Company
|-
| 46239
| City of Chester| 
| Crewe North
| 
| J Cashmore
|-
| 46240
|City of Coventry| 
| Crewe North
| 
| J. Cashmore
|-
| 46241
| City of Edinburgh| 
| Edge Hill
| 
| J. Cashmore
|-
| 46242
| City of Glasgow| 
| Parkhead
| 
| Crewe Works
|-
| 46243
| City of Lancaster| 
| Edge Hill
| 
| Central Wagon Company
|-
| 46244
| King George VI| 
| Kingmoor
| 
| West of Scotland Shipbreaking Company
|-
| 46245
| City of London| 
| Crewe North
| 
| J. Cashmore
|-
| 46246
| City of Manchester| 
| Camden
| 
| Crewe Works
|-
| 46247
| City of Liverpool| 
| Kingmoor
| 
| Crewe Ẃorks
|-
| 46248
| City of Leeds| 
| Crewe North
| 
| J. Cashmore
|-
| 46249
| City of Sheffield| 
| Polmadie
| 
| Crewe Works
|-
| 46250
| City of Lichfield| 
| Upperby
| 
| West of Scotland Shipbreaking Company
|-
| 46251
| City of Nottingham| 
| Crewe North
| 
| J. Cashmore
|-
| 46252
| City of Leicester| 
| Camden
| 
| Crewe Works
|-
| 46253
| City of St. Albans| 
| Crewe North
| 
| Crewe Works
|-
| 46254
| City of Stoke-on-Trent| 
| Crewe North
| 
| J. Cashmore
|-
| 46255
| City of Hereford| 
| Kingmoor
| 
| West of Scotland Shipbreaking Company
|-
| 46256
| Sir William A. Stanier, F.R.S.| 
| Crewe North
| 
| J. Cashmore
|-
| 46257
| City of Salford| 
| Kingmoor
| 
| West of Scotland Shipbreaking Company
|-
|}

 Preservation 

 Histories of the three preserved locomotives 
Of the 38 original members of the Coronation Class, only three locomotives have been preserved, albeit in very different ways. Two of the three preserved engines have even run on the mainline in preservation, these being 46229 & 46233. As of 2019, only 6233 is operational and has a valid main line certificate.

One member, No. 46243 City of Lancaster was the subject of an unsuccessful preservation attempt by Peter Beet.

Current numbers indicated in bold.

 No. 46229 Duchess of Hamilton 

Following its withdrawal in February 1964, no. 46229 Duchess of Hamilton was purchased by the holiday camp giant Butlin's, and put on display at their Minehead site. In 1975, following a slow deterioration due to Minehead's salty atmosphere, and the looming maintenance costs, Butlin's signed a twenty-year loan agreement for it to be taken under the wing of the National Railway Museum. In 1976, following a cosmetic overhaul, No. 46229 was put on static display in the museum's York premises. In due course a fundraising appeal allowed an overhaul to take place as a precursor to letting the locomotive operate on the national rail network once more.

In April 1980 the locomotive again took to the rails and thereafter was employed in hauling many enthusiasts' trains. After a substantial overhaul, the Duchess was declared fit in 1990 to continue working on the national network and at the same time the museum purchased it outright from Butlins. In 1998, however, the locomotive returned to static display at the National Railway Museum in York.

Following a successful appeal run by Steam Railway magazine, it was decided to re-streamline No. 46229. The locomotive was moved to Tyseley Locomotive Works, for the work to be carried out. The project was completed in 2009, and the locomotive returned to York in May, now wearing its crimson streamlining and pre-war number 6229.

 No. 46233 Duchess of Sutherland 

No. 46233, which was withdrawn at the same time as No. 46229, was also purchased by Butlin's and it was displayed at its holiday camp at Ayr, although – like No. 6229 Duchess of Hamilton'' at Minehead – it was stripped of its smoke deflectors and painted in pseudo-LMS livery.  By 1971 it had similarly deteriorated due to the salty seaside air and was in need of expensive maintenance. It was rescued by Alan Bloom, owner of Norfolk-based "Bloom's of Bressingham" nurseries; he had already taken over the Royal Scot Class No. 6100 from Butlin's Skegness holiday camp. In March 1971 No. 46233 was taken by rail and road to Bressingham on permanent loan.

Over the course of the next few years, Bloom spent some £16,000 restoring the locomotive (along with some 20,000 man hours) and in May 1974 it was restored to steam once more. Unfortunately, as 1976 progressed it was discovered that No. 46233 would require a new firebox tubeplate at a projected cost of £12,000. Bloom was not prepared to spend further money at this time and the engine became a static exhibit at Bressingham.

In 1989 Bloom bought the locomotive outright. During 1993 it was moved temporarily to the East Lancashire Railway at Bury near Manchester and whilst there an exercise was undertaken to establish what repairs were necessary and how much they would cost. It was found that the extensive list amounted to £162,000 and no business plan could be found that would support such expenditure.

In November 1995 the Princess Royal Class Locomotive Trust purchased the locomotive for £200,000 (through a third party) and the following February it was transferred to the Trust's premises at the Midland Railway in Butterley, Derbyshire. In 1998, funded by public donation and the Heritage Lottery Fund, the third party purchaser was paid off and the money was now available to restore the locomotive. The work was carried out at the railway workshops at Swanwick Junction and in July 2001 the restored locomotive was allowed a trial run on the national rail network, where it promptly broke down and had to be towed home. With the fault fixed, No. 46233 now started to generate income by hauling enthusiasts' trains, as well as the Royal Train on two occasions. Following another overhaul commencing in 2010, the locomotive resumed its steaming duties in 2012 this time wearing BR Lined Green with the early BR crest. This livery being chosen following a vote run by the PRCLT for what the engine would wear after its overhaul. It had originally been intended that 46233 would wear BR green for a year after returning to steam in 2012 before returning to its LMS Crimson lake identity a year later, it would however stay in its BR identity for an additional five years until the end of 2017. In early 2017 it had its early BR emblem replaced with the later crest and on its cabside it had the yellow cabside stripe applied, (in BR days the stripe was applied to locos which were not permitted to run under the overhead wires south of Crewe). During repairs which were undertaken at Butterley in 2018 the engine was repainted into its LMS crimson lake identity with its four digit LMS number. To date 6233 is still owned by the Princess Royal Class Locomotive Trust and still pulling enthusiasts' specials.

No. 46235 City of Birmingham 

The locomotive's official naming ceremony took place in March 1945, when it was well over five years old. Alderman Wiggins-Davies performed the ceremony at the back end of Birmingham New Street station as the locomotive was too large to be accommodated within the main part of the station.

The city's love for its eponymous locomotive was borne out when, in 1953, Birmingham's Museum of Science and Industry determined that when the opportunity arose it would like to acquire No. 46235. The museum eventually made its purchase in October 1964, when the locomotive was withdrawn. After successive spells at Crewe Works, Nuneaton, Crewe again (for cosmetic overhaul), Saltley depot and the Birmingham Lawley Street container terminal, the locomotive was finally moved to the museum in May 1966. At that time the building was still under construction, being finally completed in 1972.

In 1997 Birmingham City Council decided to close the museum and to construct the brand new ThinkTank museum (since re-christened Thinktank, Birmingham Science Museum) in nearby Digbeth. In 2001 the locomotive was moved to the Thinktank where it remains as at September 2017. It differs significantly from the other two preserved locomotives in that it represents the only untouched example of a British Railways Coronation class locomotive.

Table of Locomotives 
The following table lists the chronology of major events for the entire class. De-streamlining took several weeks, so the date for modifications has been taken as the date when the locomotive was returned to service. Entries listed as "Current" are valid as at December 2016.

Gallery

Sound 
 6233 Departing Kirkby Stephen
 6233 Passing Selside

Models 

The class has been extensively modelled by a broad range of manufacturers in both ready-to-run models and kit forms.

Hornby developed the first model of the class in OO gauge for their Dublo range in 1948, representing 6231 'Duchess of Atholl'. It was modelled with a heavy diecast 'Mazak' body and chassis with tin-plate tender, and finished in LMS Crimson Lake livery; motive power was via a 12v DC electric motor for Hornby's 3-rail track system. In 1953, smoke deflectors were added to the model, which was reliveried in BR Loco Dark Green and released as 46232 ‘Duchess of Montrose’. In 1959, the model was comprehensively retooled and released in both 3-rail and (for the first time) 2-rail versions as 46247 ‘City of Liverpool’ and 46245 ‘City of London’ respectively in BR Maroon livery with LMS-style lining. These locomotives had split footplates representing the de-streamlined versions of the locomotives, albeit with the full cylindrical smokeboxes of the later rebuilds.

After the collapse of the Meccano Ltd empire, Wrenn acquired Hornby's Dublo tooling and continued to produce a variety of locomotives of the class in various liveries using the 'City' body from 1969 until the early 1990s.

In 1970, Triang-Hornby produced a OO gauge model of the streamlined locomotives which utilised the tender base of the old Hornby Dublo model with a new polystyrene plastic body and a new Tri-ang chassis.

Hornby Railways have continued to release many incarnations of the class in both streamlined and conventional forms up to the present day.

Whitemetal and brass kits have been produced by various manufacturers including Keyser, Jamieson, Anchoridge and DJH, who have offered streamlined and conventional outlines in a variety of gauges.

References

Notes

Citations

Bibliography

Further reading

External links 
 Princess Royal Locomotive Trust (Owners of 6233)
 Thinktank, Birmingham Science Museum (46235 on display)

8 Princess Coronation
4-6-2 locomotives
Streamlined steam locomotives
Railway locomotives introduced in 1937
 
Standard gauge steam locomotives of Great Britain
Passenger locomotives